Alex or Alexander Adams may refer to:

People
Alexander Adams (British Army officer) (c. 1772–1834), lieutenant-general in the British Army
Alexander Adams (sailor) (1780–1871), Scotsman who served in the Royal Navy and the navy of the Kingdom of Hawaii
Alexander James Adams (born 1962), American singer, musician and songwriter
Alex Adams (basketball) (1934–2011), American basketball coach
Alex Adams (cricketer) (born 1975), Anguillan cricketer
Alex Adams (Canadian football), coach of the 2009 Saskatchewan Huskies football team
Alex Adams (umpire), umpire from the 2011 ICC European T20 Championship Division Two
Alex Adams (madam) (1933 or 1934–1995), alternative name of Elizabeth Adams, also known as Madam Alex, Hollywood madam

Fictional characters
Alex Adams (Holby City) (active 2000–03), in the British medical drama series Holby City